Genaro Ruiz Camacho, Jr. (September 14, 1954 – August 26, 1998), aka Geno Camacho, was a cannabis dealer and organized crime leader in Texas who was linked to four murders and eventually executed by the state of Texas.

Crime

On May 20, 1988, David L. Wilburn, 25, who worked for Sam Wright, 57, and had a mental disability, unwittingly interfered when Camacho and two accomplices tried to kidnap Wright, Evellyn Banks, 31, and Banks's 3-year-old son Andre. Wilburn was forced to lay down in Wright's home and was then shot in the back of the head, for no apparent reason. After the murder, Wright managed to escape, but Camacho and his accomplices kidnapped Evellyn and Andre Banks and killed them three days later. After this, he fled to Mexico.

The FBI learned via an informant that Camacho had escaped to the town of Arcelia, in Guerrero State, Mexico. They requested that he be extradited to the United States. Still, the Mexican authorities claimed that Arcelia and the surrounding area were under the total control of heavily armed drug lords and that any arrest attempt would result in a bloodbath. Instead, the FBI set up a sting operation to lure Camacho back to the United States. Camacho was arrested as he crossed the border near McAllen, Texas. He was convicted of the murder of Wilburn and the kidnapping and murders of Evellyn and Andre Banks (and that of Pamela Miller, a Dallas topless dancer, the reason for whose killing remains disputed) and sentenced to death. Camacho leaves behind a daughter and two sons, Theresa, Genaro, and Marco.

While on death row, Camacho was also convicted of federal charges for kidnapping and killing Evellyn Banks and her son. He faced federal charges under the Federal Kidnapping Act since they had been taken across state lines. Camacho was sentenced to life in prison on these charges.

Camacho had a last meal of steak, baked potato, salad, and strawberry ice cream and was executed by lethal injection on August 26, 1998. The execution had to be delayed by two hours, because of difficulties locating a suitable vein for the injection.

Media
The 1988 search for Genaro Ruiz Camacho was the subject of "Cracking the Cartel," episode 4 of the second series of the Discovery Channel's The FBI Files.

See also
 Capital punishment in Texas
 Capital punishment in the United States
 List of people executed in Texas, 1990–1999

General references
 Offender Information . Texas Department of Criminal Justice. Retrieved on 2007-11-17.

References

1954 births
1998 deaths
People convicted of murder by Texas
20th-century executions by Texas
People executed by Texas by lethal injection
American people executed for murder
American drug traffickers
20th-century executions of American people
People convicted of murder by the United States federal government
People convicted under the Federal Kidnapping Act
Prisoners sentenced to life imprisonment by the United States federal government